TrueHoop is a digital media company co-founded by Henry Abbott, a digital sports media executive and journalist, and Judy Goodwin, an attorney and entrepreneur. After 10 years at ESPN, Abbott relaunched TrueHoop with a subscription-based newsletter covering the National Basketball Association in February 2019.  

Prior to that, TrueHoop was a blog founded on May 15, 2005, and was one of several blogs honored with the 2005 "Best of the Web award" issued by Forbes magazine The site has linked to or been referenced by many notable publications and organizations, including NBA.com, LATimes.com, and CNN/SI.com, and has been praised by notable sports columnists such as Chad Ford and Chris Sheridan. The site has been noted for its investigations into the affairs of William Wesley, a noted (and somewhat controversial) NBA facilitator. Coaches had stars read TrueHoop, and it affected how many teams play the game.

On February, 2007, it was announced that TrueHoop was purchased by ESPN. ESPN later expanded TrueHoop to a blog network, consisting of many contributors and blogs. In addition to the blog, there was a "TruehoopTV" category of video and podcast content.

In February 2014, Abbott took over ESPN’s NBA coverage in digital and print, where he made many changes, especially creating the TrueHoop Presents team, which won National Magazine and James Beard awards, while setting traffic records with some of the finest NBA journalism in history.

Previous regular contributors

J.A. Adande
Chad Ford
John Hollinger
Marc Stein
David Thorpe
Brian Windhorst
Pablo S. Torre
Rachel Nichols (journalist)
Dorian (rapper)
 Black Tray
 BIG Wos
 Michael Kaskey-Blomain
 Mariano Bivens
 Amin Elhassan
 Zach Harper
 Tim MacMahon
 Tom Haberstroh
 Kevin Pelton
 Andrew Han
 Kaileigh Brandt
 Jade Hoye

References

External links
 

Sports blogs
Basketball mass media
ESPN.com
Internet properties established in 2005